An innuendo is a figure of speech which indicates an indirect or subtle, usually derogatory or sexually suggestive implication in expression; an insinuation; sometimes originating from multiple meanings of words or similarly spelled and/or pronounced wording.

Innuendo may also refer to:
 Innuendo (album), a 1991 music album made by Queen
 "Innuendo" (song), the opening track of the album
 Innuendo (band), a Malaysian R&B trio
 Innuendo (Amberian Dawn album), 2015